List of smartphones may refer to:
Comparison of smartphones
List of Android smartphones
Acer smartphones

Comparison of bq smartphones
Comparison of Google Nexus smartphones
Comparison of Google Pixel smartphones
Comparison of OnePlus smartphones
Comparison of Samsung Galaxy S smartphones